Shūzō, Shuzo, Shuhzoh or Shuuzou (written: , , ,  or ) is a masculine Japanese given name. Notable people with the name include:

, Japanese diplomat and politician
, Japanese Go player
, Japanese academic and philosopher
, Japanese tennis player
, Japanese Go player
, Japanese manga artist
, Japanese poet, art critic and artist
, Japanese water polo player

Japanese masculine given names